Leo Takahashi (Takahashi Ryō, born 18 December 1998) is a Japanese sailor. He competed in the 49er event at the 2020 Summer Olympics.

Takahashi was born in Japan to a New Zealand father and a Japanese mother and later moved to New Zealand at age seven.

References

External links
 
 

1998 births
Living people
Japanese male sailors (sport)
Olympic sailors of Japan
Sailors at the 2020 Summer Olympics – 49er
Sportspeople from Shizuoka Prefecture
Japanese people of New Zealand descent
New Zealand people of Japanese descent